This is the complete list of LEN European Aquatics Championships medalists in open water swimming since 1995, when the championships were part of the European Aquatics Championships (10 times of 18 total).

European Open Water Swimming Championships was seven-time stand alone championship (1989, 1991, 1993, 2008, 2011, 2012, 2016) and eleven-time part of the European Aquatics Championships (1995, 1997, 1999, 2000, 2002, 2004, 2006, 2010, 2014, 2018, 2022).

Men

5 km

10 km

25 km

Women

5 km

10 km

25 km

Mixed team

5 km

See also
List of medalists at the European Open Water Swimming Championships
List of European Aquatics Championships medalists in swimming (men)
List of European Aquatics Championships medalists in swimming (women)

References

2000 European Aquatics Championships Open Water Swimming Results
2002 European Aquatics Championships Open Water Swimming Results
2004 European Aquatics Championships Open Water Swimming Results
2006 European Aquatics Championships Open Water Swimming Results
2010 European Aquatics Championships Open Water Swimming Results

External links 
 Results MicroPlus Timing for LEN European Open Water Swimming Championships Hoorn 2016
 Results MicroPlus Timing for OpenWater European Championships 2018

LEN European Aquatics Championships
European Aquatics Championships